Tragidion coquus is a species of beetle in the family Cerambycidae. It was described by Carl Linnaeus in his landmark 1758 10th edition of Systema Naturae. The specific epithet is sometimes misspelled as "coquum", but it is a noun and must retain the spelling "coquus" under the ICZN.

References

Trachyderini
Beetles described in 1758
Taxa named by Carl Linnaeus